Greatest Hits is a compilation album by the American singer and songwriter Dolly Parton, released in September 1982. It focused mostly on her late 1970s pop hits. The original track list was revised a year later to include Parton's 1983 duet hit with Kenny Rogers, "Islands in the Stream". The album has since been reissued with an abbreviated track listing. The 1983 version was re-released on iTunes April 10, 2020.

This album was certified Platinum by the Recording Industry Association of America.

Track listing

Original 1982 edition
 "9 to 5"
 "But You Know I Love You"
 "Me and Little Andy"
 "Here You Come Again"
 "Two Doors Down"
 "It's All Wrong, But It's All Right"
 "Applejack"
 "Hard Candy Christmas"
 "Heartbreak Express"
 "Old Flames Can't Hold a Candle to You"
 "Do I Ever Cross Your Mind"
 "I Will Always Love You" 1982 version

Re-issued edition (1983)
 "9 to 5"
 "But You Know I Love You"
 "Heartbreak Express"
 "Old Flames Can't Hold a Candle to You"
 "Applejack"
 "Me and Little Andy"
 "Here You Come Again"
 "Islands in the Stream" (featuring Kenny Rogers)
 "Two Doors Down"
 "It's All Wrong, But It's All Right"
 "Do I Ever Cross Your Mind"
 "I Will Always Love You" 1982 version

Re-issued edition (1989)

The album was reissued in the late 1980s, minus the cuts "Applejack", "Heartbreak Express", "Me and Little Andy" and "Hard Candy Christmas". The out-of-print original CD issue has all 12 tracks (substituting "Islands in the Stream" for "Hard Candy Christmas"). This album includes the 1982 Best Little Whorehouse in Texas version of "I Will Always Love You".

Charts

Weekly charts

Year-end charts

Certifications

References

External links
Greatest Hits at Dolly Parton On-Line

RCA Records compilation albums
1982 greatest hits albums
Dolly Parton compilation albums